The State Basketball League All-Defensive Five was an annual State Basketball League (SBL) honour given between 2016 and 2019 to the best defensive players during the regular season in both the Men's SBL and Women's SBL.

Selections

References

Awards established in 2016
Awards disestablished in 2019
All-Defensive Five